Radio Zürisee (or radio zürisee according to the radio's logo; literally Radio Zürichsee), is a privately-owned Swiss radio station based in Rapperswil on the shore of the Lake Zurich in the canton of St. Gallen.

History 
Radio Zürisee was launched on 1 November 1983 in occasion of the licensing of private radio stations in Switzerland, as one of the first alternatives to the Swiss government-owned radio stations. In 2008, the station was allowed to establish a correspondent at the Bundeshaus by the Swiss government – the Bundeshaus Radio is airing for all 16 private radio stations from the sessions of the Swiss parliament assembly in the capital city. Radio Zürisee moved in 1994 from Stäfa to Rapperswil to a location opposite of the Rapperswil railway station, from where it is still airing. In 2011, the Bernese radio Capital FM was bought by the Zürichsee Medien AG from Tamedia.

Theodor Gut junior, editor in chief of the Zürichsee-Zeitung from 1953 to 1987, initiated the transition of his newspaper to a non-partisan forum newspaper, and the company expanded in 1983 to get involved in Radio Zürisee. Radio Zürisee is owned by the Zürichsee Medien AG in Stäfa, i.e. it is organized as an Aktiengesellschaft having a share capital of 1,500,000 Swiss Francs, of which 77% are held by the owner. In 2013 a turnover of 5,29 million Swiss Francs was resulted.

Broadcast and program 
Broadcast in the Swiss cantons of Glarus, Schaffhausen, Schwyz, St. Gallen and Zürich, the radio station has an audience of about 220,000 people aged between about 20 and 40 years. Radio Zürisee produces a news channel and location-oriented content. The radio station is very active in advertising, merchandising and is present nearly on every event of meaning within Switzerland.

Gallery

See also 
 Obersee Nachrichten
 Zürichsee-Zeitung

References

External links 

 

Publishing companies of Switzerland
Zurichsee
Mass media in Bern
Mass media in St. Gallen (city)
Mass media in Zürich
1983 establishments in Switzerland
Radio stations established in 1983
Rapperswil-Jona
Culture of the canton of St. Gallen